Strokkur (Icelandic , "churn") is a fountain-type geyser located in a geothermal area beside the Hvítá River in Iceland in the southwest part of the country, east of Reykjavík. It typically erupts every 6–10 minutes.

Location
Strokkur belongs to the Haukadalur valley area, where various other geothermal feature such as mud pools, fumaroles and other geysers are located around it, such as the famous Geysir geyser, which lies only  to the north.

History
Strokkur was first mentioned in 1789, after an earthquake helped to unblock the conduit of the geyser. It continued to erupt until the turn of the 20th century, when another earthquake blocked the conduit again. In 1963, upon the advice of the Geysir Committee, locals cleaned out the blocked conduit through the bottom of the basin, and the geyser has been regularly erupting ever since.

Tourism
Strokkur and its surrounding areas regularly attract tourists hoping to see the geyser erupt, as it is one of a very few natural geysers to erupt frequently and reliably.

Evolution of the eruption
Each frame is approximately 1/4 of a second apart, for a total of approximately two seconds:

See also

 Geography of Iceland
 Geology of Iceland
 Iceland plume
 List of volcanoes in Iceland
 Volcanism of Iceland
 Old Faithful, another naturally-occurring geyser known for erupting frequently and predictably.

References

External links
  – A picture gallery
 Information and photos of Strokkur
 Eruption of Strokkur (YouTube)

Southern Region (Iceland)
Geysers of Iceland
Volcanic systems of Iceland
West Volcanic Zone of Iceland
Pleistocene volcanoes
Articles containing video clips